Leonidas Lent Hamline (pronounced as if it were Hamlin) (1797 in Burlington, Connecticut – 1865) was an American Methodist Episcopal bishop and a lawyer.  He is the eponym of Hamline University in St. Paul, Minnesota, and of Hamline Avenue and Hamline United Methodist Church, also in St. Paul.

Hamline studied for the ministry, but afterward studied law, and practiced for a while in Ohio.  He became a preacher in the Methodist church in 1830.  In 1844, when the Methodist church divided over slavery, he was a member of the General Conference, the church's legislative body, and drew up the plan of separation.

He provided US$25,000 of his own money to launch a school, which became Hamline University. A statue of the bishop, sculpted by Michael Price, Professor of Art, stands on campus.

Hamline was the first editor of the long-running 19th century Cincinnati-based periodical, The Ladies' Repository, and Gatherings of the West.

A number of his sermons are given in the Works of L. L. Hamline, D. D., edited by Rev. F. G. Hibbard, D. D., (two volumes, 1869).

Publications
 W. C. Palmer, Life and Letters of Leonidas L. Hamline, D. D., (New York, 1866)

See also
List of bishops of the United Methodist Church

References
 Leete, Frederick DeLand, Methodist Bishops.  Nashville, The Methodist Publishing House, 1948.

1797 births
1865 deaths
Bishops of the Methodist Episcopal Church
Ohio lawyers
American Methodist bishops
Hamline University
Methodist ministers
19th-century Methodist bishops
19th-century American bishops
People from Burlington, Connecticut
19th-century American philanthropists